USS LST-952/LST(H)-952 was an  in the United States Navy. Like many of her class, she was not named and is properly referred to by her hull designation.

Construction
LST-952 was laid down on 1 September 1944, at Hingham, Massachusetts, by the Bethlehem-Hingham Shipyard; launched on 11 October 1944; and commissioned on 3 November 1944.

Service history
During World War II, LST-952 was assigned to the Asiatic-Pacific theater and participated in the assault and occupation of Okinawa Gunto from April through June 1945.

On 15 September 1945, she was redesignated LST(H)-952 and performed occupation duty in the Far East and saw service in China until early May 1946. She returned to the United States and was decommissioned on 1 August 1946, and struck from the Navy list on 22 January 1947. On 10 October 1947, the ship was sold to Luria Bros. & Co., Inc., of Philadelphia, Pennsylvania, for scrapping.

Awards
LST-952 earned one battle star for World War II service.

Notes

Citations

Bibliography 

Online resources

External links
 

LST-542-class tank landing ships
World War II amphibious warfare vessels of the United States
Ships built in Hingham, Massachusetts
1944 ships